This is a complete list of United States Navy vice admirals on active duty before 1960. The grade of vice admiral (or three-star admiral) is ordinarily the second-highest in the peacetime Navy, ranking above rear admiral and below admiral.

The grade of vice admiral was originally created to honor particularly successful Union Navy flag officers of the American Civil War. Between World War I and World War II, dozens of officers cycled through three designated vice admiral billets in the United States Fleet, holding the rank temporarily before reverting to their permanent grade of rear admiral upon relinquishing command. Dozens of temporary vice admirals were appointed during World War II alone, and by January 1, 1960, the Navy register listed 28 line officers as vice admirals on the active list in the peacetime Navy.

Many rear admirals received honorary tombstone promotions to vice admiral when they retired, having been specially commended for performance of duty in actual combat before the end of World War II, but only a handful were ever recalled to active duty in that grade. Tombstone promotions were abolished effective November 1, 1959.

Taxonomy

 A permanent vice admiral was an officer who was confirmed by the Senate to hold the permanent grade of vice admiral, which the officer retained regardless of assignment. Appointments to this permanent grade on the active list were only authorized between 1866 and 1873, and all subsequent appointments were on the retired list.
 A designated vice admiral was an officer who was designated by the President to hold the temporary rank of vice admiral while serving in a billet carrying that ex officio rank, and who reverted to a lower permanent grade upon vacating that billet. From 1915 to 1947, such designations were at the sole discretion of the President, and did not require Senate confirmation, unlike the temporary vice admirals of World War II and later. The category was eliminated by the Officer Personnel Act of 1947, which required all vice admiral appointments to be confirmed by the Senate.
 A temporary vice admiral was an officer who was confirmed by the Senate to hold the temporary grade of vice admiral under some condition, such as while serving in a particular job or for the duration of the World War II national emergency, reverting to a lower permanent grade when the condition was over.

 A civil engineer/medical director/naval constructor with rank of vice admiral was an officer in the Civil Engineer Corps/Medical Corps/Construction Corps with the title of civil engineer/medical director/naval constructor and the rank of vice admiral, prior to 1947. Each staff corps originally had its own hierarchy of titles to describe relative seniority within the corps. Staff corps titles were abolished by the Officer Personnel Act of 1947, and all officers thereafter had the same title as their rank.

 A tombstone vice admiral was a rear admiral who retired with the rank but not the pay of the next higher grade as a reward for being specially commended for the performance of duty in actual combat before the end of World War II. Most such officers never served as vice admirals while on active duty. Tombstone promotions were abolished in 1959.

List of U.S. Navy vice admirals on active duty before 1960

This is a complete list of officers who held the rank of vice admiral while on active duty in the United States Navy before January 1, 1960, including officers who received a tombstone promotion to vice admiral if they were recalled to active duty in that rank.

Entries are indexed by the numerical order in which each officer became a vice admiral on the active list, or by an asterisk (*) if the officer served in that rank only after transferring to the retired list. Each entry lists the officer's name, date appointed, date the officer vacated the active-duty rank, number of years of service as vice admiral (Yrs), positions held as vice admiral, and other biographical notes.

Italics denote active duty as vice admiral while on the retired list.

The list is sortable by active-duty appointment order, last name, date appointed, date vacated, and number of years on active duty as vice admiral.

{|class="wikitable sortable"
! |
! width=145| Name
! width=75 class="unsortable" | Photo
! width=85|Date appointed
! width=85|Date vacated
! width=20|Yrs
! class="unsortable"|Position
! width=125 class="unsortable"|Notes
|-valign=top
|align=right| || 
|
|align=right|  
|align=right|  
|align=right|  
|
Commander, West Gulf Blockading Squadron, 1862–1865.
Commander, Naval Forces, James River, 1865.
President, Board of Visitors, U.S. Naval Academy, 1865–1866.
|(1801–1870) Promoted to admiral, 25 Jul 1866. Brother-by-adoption of Navy admiral David D. Porter Jr.
|-valign=top
|align=right| || 
|
|align=right|  
|align=right|  
|align=right|  
|
Superintendent, U.S. Naval Academy, 1865–1869.
Special duty, Navy Department, 1869–1870.
|(1813–1891) Promoted to admiral, 15 Aug 1870. Brother-by-adoption of Navy admiral David G. Farragut.
|-valign=top
|align=right| || 
|
|align=right|  
|align=right|  
|align=right|  
|
President, Board of Visitors, U.S. Naval Academy, 1871.
Port Admiral, New York City/Commandant, New York Navy Yard, 1872–1876.
Port Admiral, New York City, 1876–1877.
President, Board of Examiners, 1877–1880.
Member, Board of Visitors, U.S. Naval Academy, 1880–1881.
Governor, Philadelphia Naval Asylum, 1881–1882.
Superintendent, U.S. Naval Observatory, 1882–1883.
Chairman, Lighthouse Board, 1883–1889.
|(1808–1890)
|-valign=top
|align=right| || 
|
|align=right|  
|align=right|  
|align=right|  
|
Second in command, Atlantic Fleet, 1915–1916.
|(1857–1937) Promoted to admiral, 19 Jun 1916. Governor, U.S. Naval Home, 1924–1928.
|-valign=top
|align=right| || 
|
|align=right|  
|align=right|  
|align=right|  
|
Second in command, Atlantic Fleet, 1916–1918.
|(1876–1932)
|-valign=top
|align=right| || 
|
|align=right|  
|align=right|  
|align=right|  
|
Commander, U.S. Destroyers Operating from British Bases, 1917.
Commander, U.S. Naval Forces Operating in European Waters, 1917–1919.
|(1858–1936) Promoted to admiral, 4 Dec 1918. President, Naval War College, 1917; 1919–1922. Awarded Pulitzer Prize for History, 1921.
|-valign=top
|align=right| || 
|
|align=right|  
|align=right|  
|align=right|  
|
Commander, Battleship Force 1, Atlantic Fleet, 1917–1919.
|(1856–1930)
|-valign=top
|align=right| || 
|
|align=right|  
|align=right|  
|align=right|  
|
Commander, Battleship Force 2, Atlantic Fleet, 1918–1919.
|(1861–1954) Promoted to admiral, 30 Jun 1919. Superintendent, U.S. Naval Academy, 1921–1925. Father-in-law of U.S. Secretary of War Patrick J. Hurley.
|-valign=top
|align=right| || 
|
|align=right|  
|align=right|  
|align=right|  
|
Commander, Cruiser and Transport Force, Atlantic Fleet, 1918–1919.
|(1858–1937) Promoted to admiral, 1 Sep 1919. Governor, U.S. Naval Home, 1928–1931.
|-valign=top
|align=right| 10 || 
|
|align=right|  
|align=right|  
|align=right|  
|
Commander in Chief, Asiatic Fleet, 1918–1919.
Commander, Division 1, Asiatic Fleet, 1919–1920.
|(1860–1944) Son of Navy rear admiral John Rodgers; grandson of Navy commodore John Rodgers.
|-valign=top
|align=right| 11 || 
|
|align=right|  
|align=right|  
|align=right|  
|
Commander, Battleship Force 4, Pacific Fleet, 1919–1921.
|(1863–1951) Promoted to admiral, 14 Oct 1925. President, Naval War College, 1922–1925.
|-valign=top
|align=right| 12 || 
|
|align=right|  
|align=right|  
|align=right|  
|
Commander, Battleship Force 2, Atlantic Fleet, 1919–1921.
|(1865–1939) Promoted to admiral, 30 Jun 1921.
|-valign=top
|align=right| 13 || 
|
|align=right|  
|align=right|  
|align=right|  
|
Commander, U.S. Naval Forces in European Waters, 1920.
|(1856–1928)
|-valign=top
|align=right| 14 || 
|
|align=right|  
|align=right|  
|align=right|  
|
Commander, U.S. Naval Forces in European Waters, 1920–1921.
|(1858–1942) Awarded Medal of Honor, 1914.
|-valign=top
|align=right| 15 || 
|
|align=right|  
|align=right|  
|align=right|  
|
Commander, U.S. Naval Forces in European Waters, 1921–1922.
|(1859–1929) Director of Naval Intelligence, 1919–1920; Director, International Hydrographic Bureau, 1927–1929.
|-valign=top
|align=right| 16 || 
|
|align=right|  
|align=right|  
|align=right|  
|
Commander, Battleship Force 2, Atlantic Fleet, 1921–1922.
Commander, Scouting Fleet, 1922–1923.
|(1862–1952)
|-valign=top
|align=right| 17 || 
|
|align=right|  
|align=right|  
|align=right|  
|
Commander, Battleship Force 4, Pacific Fleet, 1921–1922.
Commander, Battleship Divisions, Battle Fleet, 1922–1923.
|(1863–1938)
|-valign=top
|align=right| 18 || 
|
|align=right|  
|align=right|  
|align=right|  
|
Commander, U.S. Naval Forces in European Waters, 1922.
|(1860–1933) Promoted to admiral, 28 Aug 1922. Awarded Medal of Honor, 1914.
|-valign=top
|align=right| 19 || 
|
|align=right|  
|align=right|  
|align=right|  
|
Commander, U.S. Naval Forces in Europe, 1922–1923.
|(1866–1946) Director, International Hydrographic Bureau, 1930–1937.
|-valign=top
|align=right| 20 || 
|
|align=right|   
|align=right|   
|align=right|  
|
Commander, Battleship Divisions, Battle Fleet, 1923–1925.
|(1867–1943) Promoted to admiral, 8 Sep 1927. Chairman/Commissioner, U.S. Maritime Commission, 1936–1940.
|-valign=top
|align=right| 21 || 
|
|align=right|   
|align=right|   
|align=right|  
|
Commander, Scouting Fleet, 1923–1924.
|(1867–1951)
|-valign=top
|align=right| 22 || 
|
|align=right|  
|align=right|  
|align=right|  
|
Commander, U.S. Naval Forces in European Waters, 1923–1925.
|(1866–1935)
|-valign=top
|align=right| 23 || 
|
|align=right|  
|align=right|  
|align=right|  
|
Commander, Scouting Fleet, 1924–1926.
|(1864–1951)
|-valign=top
|align=right| 24 || 
|
|align=right|  
|align=right|  
|align=right|  
|
Commander, Battleship Divisions, Battle Fleet, 1925–1926.
|(1866–1971) Promoted to admiral, 4 Sep 1926. Distant cousin of Air Force four-star general Charles P. Cabell.
|-valign=top
|align=right| 25 || 
|
|align=right|   
|align=right|   
|align=right|  
|
Commander, U.S. Naval Forces in European Waters, 1925–1926.
|(1862–1932) Director of Naval Intelligence, 1917–1919.
|-valign=top
|align=right| 26 || 
|
|align=right|  
|align=right|  
|align=right|  
|
Commander, Scouting Fleet, 1926–1928.
|(1867–1930)
|-valign=top
|align=right| 27 || 
|
|align=right|  
|align=right|  
|align=right|  
|
Commander, Battleship Divisions, Battle Fleet, 1926–1927.
|(1867–1947) Promoted to admiral, 10 Sep 1927.
|-valign=top
|align=right| 28 || 
|
|align=right|  
|align=right|  
|align=right|  
|
Commander, U.S. Naval Forces in European Waters, 1926–1928.
|(1867–1954)
|-valign=top
|align=right| 29 || 
|
|align=right|  
|align=right|  
|align=right|  
|
Commander, Battleship Divisions, Battle Fleet, 1927–1928.
|(1869–1957) Promoted to admiral, 26 Jun 1928. President, Naval War College, 1925–1927.
|-valign=top
|align=right| 30 || 
|
|align=right|  
|align=right|  
|align=right|  
|
Commander, Battleship Divisions, Battle Fleet, 1928–1929.
|(1869–1954) Promoted to admiral, 21 May 1929. Superintendent, U.S. Naval Academy, 1925–1928.
|-valign=top
|align=right| 31 || 
|
|align=right|  
|align=right|  
|align=right|  
|
Commander, Scouting Fleet, 1928–1929.
|(1869–1952) Promoted to admiral, 1 Sep 1931. Grandnephew of U.S. President Zachary Taylor; distant cousin of Army four-star general Montgomery C. Meigs.
|-valign=top
|align=right| 32 || 
|
|align=right|  
|align=right|  
|align=right|  
|
Commander, U.S. Naval Forces in European Waters, 1928–1929.
|(1869–1953)
|-valign=top
|align=right| 33 || 
|
|align=right|  
|align=right|  
|align=right|  
|
Commander, Battleship Divisions, Battle Fleet, 1929–1930.
|(1869–1940)
|-valign=top
|align=right| 34 || 
|
|align=right|  
|align=right|  
|align=right|  
|
Commander, Scouting Fleet, 1929–1930.
|(1868–1935)
|-valign=top
|align=right| 35 || 
|
|align=right|   
|align=right|   
|align=right|  
|
Commander, Battleship Divisions, Battle Fleet, 1930–1931.
Commander, Battleships, Battle Force, 1931.
|(1870–1946) Promoted to admiral, 15 Sep 1931.
|-valign=top
|align=right| 36 || 
|
|align=right|  
|align=right|  
|align=right|  
|
Commander, Scouting Fleet, 1930–1931.
Commander, Scouting Force, 1931–1932.
|(1870–1935)
|-valign=top
|align=right| 37 || 
|
|align=right|  
|align=right|  
|align=right|  
|
Commander, Light Cruiser Divisions, Scouting Fleet, 1927–1931.
Commander, Cruisers, Scouting Force, 1931.
|(1869–1941)
|-valign=top
|align=right| 38 || 
|
|align=right|  
|align=right|  
|align=right|  
|
Commander, Battleships, Battle Force, 1931–1932.
|(1871–1952) Promoted to admiral, 11 Aug 1932. Governor of Guam, 1907; Director of Naval Intelligence, 1921–1923; President, Naval War College, 1933–1934.
|-valign=top
|align=right| 39 || 
|
|align=right|  
|align=right|  
|align=right|  
|
Commander, Cruisers, Scouting Force, 1931–1933.
|(1872–1963) Promoted to admiral, 20 May 1933. U.S. Ambassador to the Soviet Union, 1942–1943.
|-valign=top
|align=right| 40 || 
|
|align=right|  
|align=right|  
|align=right|  
|
Commander, Scouting Force, 1932–1933.
|(1871–1947)
|-valign=top
|align=right| 41 || 
|
|align=right|  
|align=right|  
|align=right|  
|
Commander, Battleships, Battle Force, 1932.
|(1873–1932) Died in office.
|-valign=top
|align=right| 42 || 
|
|align=right|  
|align=right|  
|align=right|  
|
Commander, Battleships, Battle Force, 1932–1933.
|(1874–1949) Promoted to admiral, 10 Jun 1933. Superintendent, U.S. Naval Academy, 1934–1938.
|-valign=top
|align=right| 43 || 
|
|align=right|  
|align=right|  
|align=right|  
|
Commander, Scouting Force, 1933–1934.
|(1874–1950) Promoted to admiral, 15 Jun 1934.
|-valign=top
|align=right| 44 || 
|
|align=right|  
|align=right|  
|align=right|  
|
Commander, Cruisers, Scouting Force, 1933–1935.
|(1873–1941) Promoted to admiral, 1 Apr 1935. President, Naval War College, 1930–1933; Governor, U.S. Naval Home, 1937–1941.
|-valign=top
|align=right| 45 || 
|
|align=right|  23 Feb 1942  
|align=right|  15 Jun 1942  
|align=right|  
|
Commander, Battleships, Battle Force, 1933.
Lend-Lease Liaison Officer, 1941–1945.
|(1872–1948)Naval aviation observer. Promoted to admiral, 1 Jul 1933.
|-valign=top
|align=right| 46 || 
|
|align=right|   
|align=right|   
|align=right|  
|
Commander, Battleships, Battle Force, 1933–1934.
|(1876–1943)
|-valign=top
|align=right| 47 || 
|
|align=right|  
|align=right|  
|align=right|  
|
Commander, Scouting Force, 1934–1935.
|(1872–1946)
|-valign=top
|align=right| 48 || 
|
|align=right|  16 Jun 1942  
|align=right|  10 Nov 1945  
|align=right|  
|
Commander, Battleships, Battle Force, 1934–1935.
Superintendent, New York State Maritime Academy, 1942–1945.
|(1873–1950)
|-valign=top
|align=right| 49 || 
|
|align=right|  24 Jul 1942  
|align=right|  31 Oct 1944  
|align=right|  
|
Commander, Aircraft, Battle Force, 1934–1936.
Administrative Officer, Office of the Secretary of the Navy, 1942–1944.
|(1874–1957)Naval aviation observer.
|-valign=top
|align=right| 50 || 
|
|align=right|  
|align=right|  
|align=right|  
|
Commander, Scouting Force, 1935–1936.
|(1877–1964) Promoted to admiral, 24 Jun 1936.
|-valign=top
|align=right| 51 || 
|
|align=right|  
|align=right|  
|align=right|  
|
Commander, Battleships, Battle Force, 1935–1936.
|(1875–1959) Promoted to admiral, 30 Mar 1936; to fleet admiral, 15 Dec 1944. Governor of Puerto Rico, 1939–1940; U.S. Ambassador to France, 1941–1942. Wife's niece married Navy admiral David W. Bagley.
|-valign=top
|align=right| 52 || 
|
|align=right|  
|align=right|  
|align=right|  
|
Commander, Battleships, Battle Force, 1936–1937.
|(1874–1959)
|-valign=top
|align=right| 53 || 
|
|align=right|  21 Mar 1942  
|align=right|  28 Jan 1945  
|align=right|  
|
Commander, Aircraft, Battle Force, 1936–1938.
Vice Chief of Naval Operations, 1942–1945.
|(1880–1959)Naval aviation observer. Promoted to admiral, 15 Dec 1944.
|-valign=top
|align=right| 54 || 
|
|align=right|   1 Aug 1942  
|align=right|  12 Nov 1945  
|align=right|  
|
Commander, Scouting Force, 1936–1938.
Adviser, Office of Strategic Services, 1942–1945.
|(1878–1972)
|-valign=top
|align=right| 55 || 
|
|align=right|  
|align=right|  
|align=right|  
|
Commander, Battleships, Battle Force, 1937–1938.
|(1877–1954) Promoted to admiral, 29 Jan 1938. President, Naval War College, 1934–1936; 1939–1942.
|-valign=top
|align=right| 56 || 
|
|align=right|  30 May 1942   1 Feb 1944  
|align=right|   1 Feb 1944  24 Apr 1946  
|align=right|  
|
Commander, Battleships, Battle Force, 1938–1939.
Commander, Western Sea Frontier/Commandant, Twelfth Naval District, 1942–1944.
Coordinator, Naval Logistics, Pacific Coast, 1944.
Resources Coordinator, Western Sea Frontier, 1945.
|(1880–1950)
|-valign=top
|align=right| 57 || 
|
|align=right|  
|align=right|  
|align=right|  
|
Commander, Aircraft, Battle Force, 1938–1939.
|(1878–1956)Naval aviator. Promoted to admiral, 1 Feb 1941; to fleet admiral, 17 Dec 1944. Awarded Congressional Gold Medal, 1946. Father-in-law of Air Force four-star general Frederic H. Smith Jr.
|-valign=top
|align=right| 58 || 
|
|align=right|  30 May 1942   1 Nov 1943  
|align=right|   1 Nov 1943  15 May 1945  
|align=right|  
|
Commander, Scouting Force, 1938–1941.
Commander, Eastern Sea Frontier, 1942–1943.
Chairman, Navy Manpower Survey Board, 1943–1945.
|(1879–1948)
|-valign=top
|align=right| 59 || 
|
|align=right|  
|align=right|  
|align=right|  
|
Commander, Battleships, Battle Force, 1939–1940.
|(1879–1964) Promoted to admiral, 6 Jan 1940. President, Naval War College, 1937–1939.
|-valign=top
|align=right| 60 || 
|
|align=right|  
|align=right|  
|align=right|  
|
Commander, Aircraft, Battle Force, 1939–1940.
|(1879–1950)Naval aviation observer.
|-valign=top
|align=right| 61 || 
|
|align=right|   1 Jul 1944  
|align=right|  13 Dec 1945  
|align=right|  
|
Commander, Battleships, Battle Force, 1940–1941.
Commander, Battle Force, Pacific Fleet, 1941–1942.
President, Naval War College, 1942–1945.
|(1880–1959)
|-valign=top
|align=right| 62 || 
|
|align=right|  
|align=right|  
|align=right|  
|
Commander, Aircraft, Battle Force, 1940–1941.
Commander, Aircraft, Battle Force, Pacific Fleet, 1941–1942.
Commander, Carriers, Pacific Fleet, 1942.
Commander, South Pacific Area and South Pacific Force, 1942–1943.
|(1882–1959)Naval aviator. Promoted to admiral, 18 Nov 1942; to fleet admiral, 4 Dec 1945.
|-valign=top
|align=right| 63 || 
|
|align=right|   1 Dec 1944  
|align=right|  18 Sep 1945  
|align=right|  
|
Commander, Scouting Force, Pacific Fleet, 1941–1942.
Commander, Amphibious Force, Pacific Fleet, 1942.
Naval Aide to the President, 1943–1945.
|(1881–1957)
|-valign=top
|align=right| 64 || 
|
|align=right|  
|align=right|  
|align=right|  
|
Special observer, American Embassy, London, 1940–1942.
Commander, South Pacific Area and South Pacific Force, 1942.
Commander, Hawaiian Sea Frontier/Commandant, Fourteenth Naval District, 1943–1944.
Commander, U.S. Naval Forces, Germany, 1944–1945.
Chairman, General Board of the Navy, 1946.
|(1883–1958)
|-valign=top
|align=center| * || 
|
|align=right|  
|align=right|  
|align=right|  
|
Chairman, Board of Medals and Decorations, U.S. Maritime Commission, 1941–1946.
|(1877–1946) Died in office.
|-valign=top
|align=right| 65 || 
|
|align=right|  
|align=right|  
|align=right|  
|
Commander in Chief, U.S. Atlantic Fleet, 1941–1944.
|(1883–1976) Promoted to admiral, 1 Jul 1942.
|-valign=top
|align=center| * || 
|
|align=right|  
|align=right|  
|align=right|  
|
U.S. Naval Member, Joint Mexican-United States Defense Commission/Senior U.S. Naval Member, Permanent Joint Board on Defense, Canada-United States, 1942.U.S. Naval Member, Joint Mexican-United States Defense Commission/Senior U.S. Naval Member, Permanent Joint Board on Defense, Canada-United States/U.S. Naval Delegate, Inter-American Defense Board, 1942–1945.|(1876–1963)
|-valign=top
|align=right| 66 || 
|
|align=right|  
|align=right|  
|align=right|  
|
Director, Office of Procurement and Material, 1942–1946.
|(1882–1972) Engineering duty officer. Promoted to admiral, 27 Aug 1945. Administrator, Webb Institute of Naval Architecture, 1946–1951.
|-valign=top
|align=right| 67 || 
|
|align=right|  29 May 1943  
|align=right|   1 Mar 1947  
|align=right|  
|
Commander, U.S. Naval Forces, Southwest Pacific, 1942.
Personal Representative of the President, with rank of Minister, French West Africa, 1943–1944.
Deputy Commander for Occupied Countries, U.S. Naval Forces in Europe, 1944–1945.
Commander, Eighth Fleet, 1945.
Commander, U.S. Naval Forces, Northwest African Waters, 1945.
Commander, U.S. Naval Forces, Germany, 1945–1946.
|(1886–1958)
|-valign=top
|align=right| 68 || 
|
|align=right|  20 Sep 1942   1 Nov 1943  
|align=right|   1 Apr 1943  16 Jan 1946  
|align=right|  
|
Commander, ANZAC Force, 1942.
Commander, Allied Naval Forces, Southwest Pacific Area/Commander, Southwest Pacific Force, 1942.
Commander, Battleships, Pacific Fleet, 1942–1943.
Commander, Eastern Sea Frontier, 1943–1945.
Commander, Eastern Sea Frontier/Gulf Sea Frontier/Sixteenth Fleet, 1945–1946.
|(1885–1957) President, New York Maritime Academy, 1946–1949; President, New York State Maritime College, 1949–1951.
|-valign=top
|align=center| * || 
|
|align=right|  
|align=right|  
|align=right|  
|Special Adviser to the Chinese Military Mission, 1941–1943.|(1875–1959)
|-valign=top
|align=right| 69 || 
|
|align=right|  
|align=right|  
|align=right|  
|
Commander, Service Force, Pacific Fleet, 1942–1945.
Commander, South Pacific Area, 1945.
Naval Inspector General, 1945–1946.
General Inspector, Western Sea Frontier, 1946.
|(1884–1963) Great-grandson of U.S. Vice President John C. Calhoun.
|-valign=top
|align=right| 70 || 
|
|align=right|  
|align=right|  
|align=right|  
|
Commander, Service Force, Atlantic Fleet, 1942.
|(1881–1978)
|-valign=top
|align=right| 71 || 
|
|align=right|  
|align=right|  
|align=right|  
|
Commander, Task Force 3, Atlantic Fleet, 1941–1942.
Commander, Task Force 23, Atlantic Fleet, 1942.
Commander, South Atlantic Force, 1942–1943.
Commander, Fourth Fleet, 1943–1944.
|(1886–1952) Promoted to admiral, 15 Nov 1944. Commissioner, All-America Football Conference, 1947–1949. Awarded Medal of Honor, 1914.
|-valign=top
|align=right| 72 || 
|
|align=right|  
|align=right|  
|align=right|  
|
Commander, Task Force 4, Atlantic Fleet, 1941–1942.
Commander, Task Force 24, Atlantic Fleet, 1942.
|(1886–1942)Naval aviator. Died in office. 
|-valign=top
|align=right| 73 || 
|
|align=right|   1 Jan 1943  
|align=right|   5 Feb 1946  
|align=right|  
|
Chief of Staff/Aide to the Commander in Chief, United States Fleet, 1941–1942.
Deputy Commander in Chief, United States Fleet, 1942.
Deputy Commander in Chief, United States Fleet/Navy Member, Joint Strategic Survey Committee, Joint Chiefs of Staff, 1942.
Navy Member, Joint Strategic Survey Committee, Joint Chiefs of Staff, 1942.Navy Member, Joint Strategic Survey Committee, Joint Chiefs of Staff, 1943–1946.|(1883–1948)
|-valign=top
|align=right| 74 || 
|
|align=right|   1 Nov 1943  
|align=right|  22 Aug 1946  
|align=right|  
|
Commander, Task Force 24, Atlantic Fleet, 1942–1943.Senior Naval Member, Joint Production Survey Committee, Joint Chiefs of Staff, 1943–1945.|(1886–1967)
|-valign=top
|align=right| 75 || 
|
|align=right|   1 May 1944  
|align=right|   1 Jul 1948  
|align=right|  
|
Commander, Caribbean Sea Frontier/Commandant, Tenth Naval District, 1942–1943.
Commander, Forward Area, Central Pacific, 1944–1945.
Commander, Marianas Area, 1945.
Deputy Commander in Chief, Pacific Fleet and Pacific Ocean Areas, 1945.
Commander, Fleet Air, West Coast, 1945–1946.
Member, General Board of the Navy, 1946.
President, Naval Examining and Retiring Board, 1946–1948.
|(1887–1970)Naval aviator. Retired as admiral, 1 Jul 1948.
|-valign=top
|align=right| 76 || 
|
|align=right|  
|align=right|  
|align=right|  
|
Commander, Cruisers, Pacific Fleet, 1942.
Commander, Northwest Sea Frontier/Commandant, Thirteenth Naval District, 1942–1943.
Commander, North Pacific Area/Northwest Sea Frontier, 1943–1944.
Commander, North Pacific Area/Alaskan Sea Frontier, 1944–1945.
Member, General Board of the Navy, 1945–1946.
Chairman, General Board of the Navy, 1946–1947.
|(1885–1973) Retired as admiral, 1 May 1947. Awarded Medal of Honor, 1914. Nephew of Navy four-star admiral Frank F. Fletcher.
|-valign=top
|align=right| 77 || 
|
|align=right|  
|align=right|  
|align=right|  
|
Commander, Northwest Sea Frontier/Commandant, Thirteenth Naval District, 1942.
|(1878–1969)
|-valign=top
|align=right| 78 || 
|
|align=right|  
|align=right|  
|align=right|  
|
Chief of Staff, United States Fleet, 1942–1944.
Deputy Commander in Chief, United States Fleet/Deputy Chief of Naval Operations, 1944–1945.
|(1885–1956) Promoted to admiral, 3 Apr 1945.
|-valign=top
|align=right| 79 || 
|
|align=right|  
|align=right|  
|align=right|  
|
Commander, Service Force, Atlantic Fleet, 1942–1944.
|(1885–1975)
|-valign=top
|align=right| 80 || 
|
|align=right|   3 Apr 1945  
|align=right|   1 Nov 1946  
|align=right|  
|
Commander, Allied Naval Forces, Southwest Pacific Area/Southwest Pacific Force, 1942–1943.
Commander, Allied Naval Forces, Southwest Pacific Area/Seventh Fleet, 1943.
Commander, Midwest Naval Area/Commandant, Ninth Naval District, 1945–1946.
Director of Public Relations, 1946.
|(1884–1959) Retired as admiral, 1 Nov 1946.
|-valign=top
|align=right| 81 || 
|
|align=right|  
|align=right|  
|align=right|  
|
Commander, Air Force, Pacific Fleet, 1942–1944.
Deputy Commander in Chief, Pacific Fleet and Pacific Ocean Areas, 1944–1945.
|(1885–1955)Naval aviator. Promoted to admiral, 7 Nov 1945.
|-valign=top
|align=right| 82 || 
|
|align=right|  
|align=right|  
|align=right|  
|
Commander, Amphibious Force, Atlantic Fleet, 1942–1943.
Commander, U.S. Naval Forces, Northwest African Waters/Eighth Fleet, 1943–1945.
|(1887–1972) Promoted to admiral, 3 Apr 1945.
|-valign=top
|align=right| 83 || 
|
|align=right|  
|align=right|  
|align=right|  
|
Commander, Aircraft, South Pacific Force, 1942–1944.
Deputy Chief of Naval Operations (Air), 1944–1945.
Superintendent, U.S. Naval Academy/Commandant, Severn River Naval Command, 1945–1947.
Special duty, Office of the Under Secretary of the Navy, 1947.
Senior Member, Naval Clemency and Prison Inspection Board, 1947.
|(1883–1948)Naval aviator. Retired as admiral, 1 Jul 1947.
|-valign=top
|align=center| * || 
|
|align=right|  16 Jul 1943  
|align=right|  27 Apr 1947  
|align=right|  
|Senior Member, Naval Clemency and Prison Inspection Board, 1943–1946.Special duty, Office of the Secretary of the Navy, 1946–1947.|(1877–1947)
|-valign=top
|align=right| 84 || 
|
|align=right|  
|align=right|  
|align=right|  
|
Commander, Central Pacific Force, 1943–1944.
|(1886–1969) Promoted to admiral, 16 Feb 1944. President, Naval War College, 1946–1948; U.S. Ambassador to the Philippines, 1952–1955.
|-valign=top
|align=right| 85 || 
|
|align=right|  
|align=right|  
|align=right|  
|
Commander, North Pacific Area, 1943.
Commander, Allied Naval Forces Southwest Pacific/Seventh Fleet, 1943–1945.
|(1888–1972) Promoted to admiral, 3 Apr 1945. Brother-in-law of Navy four-star admiral Husband E. Kimmel.
|-valign=top
|align=right| 86 || 
|
|align=right|  
|align=right|  
|align=right|  
|
Commander, Caribbean Sea Frontier/Commandant, Tenth Naval District, 1943–1944.
|(1881–1952)Naval aviator. Retired 1 Dec 1944.
|-valign=top
|align=right| 87 || 
|
|align=right|  
|align=right|  
|align=right|  
|
Deputy Chief of Naval Operations (Air), 1943–1944.
Commander, Second Fast Carrier Force, Pacific Fleet, 1944–1945.
|(1884–1945)Naval aviator. Promoted to admiral, 6 Sep 1945. Father of Navy four-star admiral John S. McCain Jr.; grandfather of U.S. Senator John S. McCain III. Died in office.
|-valign=top
|align=right| 88 || 
|
|align=right|  
|align=right|  
|align=right|  
|
Commander, Air Force, Atlantic Fleet, 1943–1946.
Member, General Board of the Navy, 1946–1947.
|(1885–1962)Naval aviator.
|-valign=top
|align=right| 89 || 
|
|align=right|  
|align=right|  
|align=right|  
|
Commander, Submarine Force, Pacific Fleet, 1943–1945.
Naval Inspector General, 1946–1947.
|(1890–1967)
|-valign=top
|align=right| 90 || 
|
|align=right|  
|align=right|  
|align=right|  
|
Deputy Commander in Chief, Pacific Ocean Areas, 1943.
Deputy Commander in Chief, Pacific Fleet and Pacific Ocean Areas, 1943–1944.
Deputy Commander, South Pacific Area/South Pacific Force, 1944.
Commander, South Pacific Area/South Pacific Force, 1944–1945.
Inspector General, Pacific Fleet and Pacific Ocean Areas, 1945.
Deputy Commander in Chief, Pacific Fleet and Pacific Ocean Areas, 1945.
|(1881–1948)
|-valign=top
|align=right| 91 || 
|
|align=right|  
|align=right|  
|align=right|  
|
Commander, Western Sea Frontier, 1944.
Commander, Hawaiian Sea Frontier/Commandant, Fourteenth Naval District, 1944–1945.
U.S. Naval Member, Joint Mexican-United States Defense Commission/Senior U.S. Naval Member, Permanent Joint Board on Defense, Canada-United States/U.S. Naval Delegate, Inter-American Defense Board, 1945–1946.
|(1883–1960) Retired as admiral, 1 Apr 1947. Father of Navy four-star admiral David H. Bagley and Navy four-star admiral Worth H. Bagley; grandson of North Carolina Governor Jonathan Worth; aunt married U.S. Secretary of the Navy Josephus Daniels; wife's aunt married Navy admiral William D. Leahy.
|-valign=top
|align=right| 92 || 
|
|align=right|   1 Nov 1946  
|align=right|   1 Nov 1952  
|align=right|  
|
Chief of Naval Personnel/Chief, Bureau of Naval Personnel, 1942–1945.Governor, U.S. Naval Home, 1946–1952.|(1885–1967)
|-valign=top
|align=right| 93 || 
|
|align=right|  
|align=right|  
|align=right|  
|
Surgeon General, U.S. Navy/Chief, Bureau of Medicine and Surgery, 1938–1946.
|(1889–1959) Medical Corps.
|-valign=top
|align=right| 94 || 
|
|align=right|  
|align=right|  
|align=right|  
|
Chief, Bureau of Yards and Docks, 1937–1945.
Chief, Material Division, Office of the Assistant Secretary of the Navy, 1945–1946.
Deputy Coal Mines Administrator, 1946.
Coal Mines Administrator, 1946.
|(1892–1978) Civil Engineer Corps. Promoted to admiral, 11 Jun 1946.
|-valign=top
|align=right| 95 || 
|
|align=right|  
|align=right|  
|align=right|  
|
Commander, Amphibious Forces, Pacific/Fifth Amphibious Force, Pacific Fleet, 1944–1945.
Commander, Amphibious Forces, Pacific, 1945.
|(1885–1961)Naval aviator. Promoted to admiral, 24 May 1945.
|-valign=top
|align=right| 96 || 
|
|align=right|  
|align=right|  
|align=right|  
|
Commander, Battleships, Pacific Fleet, 1943–1944.
Commander, Battleship Squadron Two, Pacific Fleet, 1944–1945.
Commander, Composite Task Force, Atlantic Fleet, 1945.
|(1888–1945) Died in office.
|-valign=top
|align=right| 97 || 
|
|align=right|  
|align=right|  
|align=right|  
|
Commander, First Fast Carrier Force, Pacific Fleet, 1944–1945.
Deputy Chief of Naval Operations (Air), 1945–1946.
|(1887–1947)Naval aviator. Promoted to admiral, 1 Mar 1946.
|-valign=top
|align=right| 98 || 
|
|align=right|  
|align=right|  
|align=right|  
|
Commander, Caribbean Sea Frontier/Commandant, Tenth Naval District, 1944–1945.
Commander, Service Force, Atlantic Fleet, 1945.
|(1886–1962)
|-valign=top
|align=center| * || 
|
|align=right|  
|align=right|  
|align=right|  
|Chairman, U.S. Maritime Commission, 1938–1946.|(1879–1971) Construction Corps.
|-valign=top
|align=right| 99 || 
|
|align=right|  
|align=right|  
|align=right|  
|
Commander, Third Amphibious Force, Pacific Fleet, 1944–1945.
Member, Joint Strategic Survey Committee, Joint Chiefs of Staff, 1946.
|(1888–1946) Died in office. Awarded Medal of Honor, 1914.
|-valign=top
|align=right| 100 || 
|
|align=right|  
|align=right|  
|align=right|  
|
Commander, U.S. Naval Forces, France, 1944–1945.
Member, General Board of the Navy, 1945–1946.
|(1888–1963) Retired as admiral, 1 Mar 1946. Director of Naval Intelligence, 1941; U.S. Ambassador to Belgium and Luxembourg, 1946–1947; to Soviet Union, 1949–1952; to China, 1962–1963.
|-valign=top
|align=right| 101 || 
|
|align=right|  
|align=right|  
|align=right|  
|
Chief of Staff, United States Fleet, 1944–1945.
Deputy Chief of Naval Operations (Operations), 1945.
|(1886–1970) Promoted to admiral, 8 Jan 1946.
|-valign=top
|align=right| 102 || 
|
|align=right|   1 Oct 1945  
|align=right|   1 Jan 1946  
|align=right|  
|
Vice Chairman, U.S. Maritime Commission, 1942–1945.Vice Chairman, U.S. Maritime Commission, 1945.|(1892–1946) Engineering duty officer (ship or hull construction).
|-valign=top
|align=right| 103 || 
|
|align=right|  
|align=right|  
|align=right|  
|
Commander, Fourth Fleet, 1944–1945.
Commander, South Atlantic Force, 1945.
Commander, Caribbean Sea Frontier/Commandant, Tenth Naval District, 1945–1947.
|(1886–1966)
|-valign=top
|align=right| 104 || 
|
|align=right|  
|align=right|  
|align=right|  
|
Chief of Staff/Aide to the Commander in Chief, Pacific Fleet and Pacific Ocean Areas, 1943–1946.
Commander, Fourth Fleet, 1946.
Member, General Board of the Navy, 1946–1947.
Chairman, General Board of the Navy, 1947–1948.
|(1890–1954)
|-valign=top
|align=right| 105 || 
|
|align=right|  
|align=right|  
|align=right|  
|
Commander, Air Force, Pacific Fleet, 1944–1945.
Commander, Marianas, 1945.
Commander, Midwest Naval Area/Commandant, Ninth Naval District, 1946–1947.
Commander, First Task Fleet, 1947–1948.
Commander, Western Sea Frontier/Pacific Reserve Fleet, 1948–1951.
|(1889–1956)Naval aviator. Retired as admiral, 1 Aug 1951.
|-valign=top
|align=right| 106 || 
|
|align=right|  
|align=right|  
|align=right|  
|
Commander, Battleship Squadron One, Pacific Fleet, 1944–1945.
Commandant, Eleventh Naval District, 1945–1947.
Commander, Western Sea Frontier/Pacific Reserve Fleet, 1947–1948.
|(1887–1974) Retired as admiral, 1 Sep 1948.
|-valign=top
|align=right| 107 || 
|
|align=right|  
|align=right|  
|align=right|  
|
Commander, Seventh Amphibious Force, Pacific Fleet, 1943–1945.
Commander, Seventh Fleet/Seventh Amphibious Force, Pacific Fleet, 1945–1946.
Commander, Amphibious Forces, Atlantic Fleet, 1946.
Commander, Fourth Fleet, 1946–1947.
Commander, Caribbean Sea Frontier/Commandant, Tenth Naval District, 1947–1950.
|(1889–1969)
|-valign=top
|align=right| 108 || 
|
|align=right|  
|align=right|  
|align=right|  
|
Commander, Service Force, Atlantic Fleet, 1944–1945.
Commander, Hawaiian Sea Frontier/Commandant, Fourteenth Naval District, 1945–1946.
|(1884–1965)
|-valign=top
|align=center| * || 
|
|align=right|  
|align=right|  
|align=right|  
|Member, General Board of the Navy, 1945–1946.|(1886–1978)
|-valign=top
|align=right| 109 || 
|
|align=right|  
|align=right|  
|align=right|  
|
Commander, Service Force, Pacific Fleet, 1945–1946.
Member, General Board of the Navy, 1946.
Chairman, U.S. Maritime Commission, 1946–1949.
|(1888–1966)
|-valign=top
|align=right| 110 || 
|
|align=right|  
|align=right|  
|align=right|  
|
Commander, Gulf Sea Frontier/Commandant, Seventh Naval District, 1944–1945.
|(1881–1981)
|-valign=top
|align=right| 111 || 
|
|align=right|  
|align=right|  
|align=right|  
|
Sub Chief of Naval Operations, 1943–1945.
Deputy Chief of Naval Operations (Logistics), 1945–1946.
|(1885–1963)
|-valign=top
|align=right| 112 || 
|
|align=right|  
|align=right|  
|align=right|  
|
Commander, Philippine Sea Frontier, 1944–1946.
|(1887–1963)
|-valign=top
|align=right| 113 || 
|
|align=right|  
|align=right|  
|align=right|  
|
Chief, Bureau of Ships, 1942–1946.
Chief, Materiel Division, Office of the Assistant Secretary of the Navy, 1946–1947.
|(1892–1959) Engineering duty officer (ship or hull construction)
|-valign=top
|align=right| 114 || 
|
|align=right|  21 Oct 1952  
|align=right|  21 May 1954  
|align=right|  
|
Commander, Fifth Amphibious Force, Pacific Fleet, 1945.
Commandant, Army-Navy Staff College, 1945–1946.
Commandant, National War College, 1946–1949.
Chairman, General Board of the Navy, 1949–1950.
Superintendent, U.S. Naval Academy, 1950–1952.Governor, U.S. Naval Home, 1952–1954.|(1890–1971) Retired as admiral, 1 May 1952.
|-valign=top
|align=right| 115 || 
|
|align=right|  
|align=right|  
|align=right|  
|
Commander, First Fast Carrier Force, Pacific Fleet, 1945–1946.
Commander, Fifth Fleet, 1946.
|(1880–1957)Naval aviator. Retired as admiral, 1 Mar 1947.
|-valign=top
|align=right| 116 || 
|
|align=right|  
|align=right|  
|align=right|  
|
Chief of Naval Personnel/Chief, Bureau of Naval Personnel, 1945.
Deputy Chief of Naval Operations (Personnel)/Chief of Naval Personnel/Chief, Bureau of Naval Personnel, 1945–1947.
|(1891–1972) Promoted to admiral, 7 Jan 1946. Candidate for Republican Party nomination for Governor of Massachusetts, 1950.
|-valign=top
|align=right| 117 || 
|
|align=right|  
|align=right|  
|align=right|  
|
Deputy Commander in Chief, Pacific Fleet and Pacific Ocean Areas, 1945.
|(1888–1961)Naval aviator. Promoted to admiral, 28 Dec 1945.
|-valign=top
|align=right| 118 || 
|
|align=right|  
|align=right|  
|align=right|  
|
Commander, Third Fleet, 1945–1946.
|(1890–1968)
|-valign=top
|align=right| 119 || 
|
|align=right|  
|align=right|  
|align=right|  
|
Commander, Air Force, Pacific Fleet, 1945–1946.
Commander, Fifth Fleet, 1946–1947.
Commander, First Task Fleet, 1947.
|(1891–1972)Naval aviator.
|-valign=top
|align=right| 120 || 
|
|align=right|  
|align=right|  
|align=right|  
|
Commander, Amphibious Forces, Pacific Fleet, 1945–1946.
Commander, Hawaiian Sea Frontier/Commandant, Fourteenth Naval District, 1946–1948.
Commandant, Armed Forces Staff College, 1948–1951.
Commander, Western Sea Frontier/Pacific Reserve Fleet, 1951–1953.
|(1891–1978) Retired as admiral, May 1953.
|-valign=top
|align=right| 121 || 
|
|align=right|  
|align=right|  
|align=right|  
|
Commander, Service Force, Atlantic Fleet, 1945–1947.
|(1891–1954)
|-valign=top
|align=right| 122 || 
|
|align=right|   1 Dec 1950  
|align=right|   1 Nov 1953  
|align=right|  
|
Deputy Chief of Naval Operations (Operations), 1945–1946.
Deputy Chief of Naval Operations (Administration), 1946.
U.S. Naval Advisor to the Secretary of State for the Paris Peace Conference/U.S. Naval Advisor to the Council of Foreign Ministers during the period of the Peace Conference/U.S. Naval Advisor to the European Advisory Commission, 1946.
President, Naval War College, 1950–1953.
|(1892–1962) Promoted to admiral, 23 Sep 1946. President, Long Island University, 1953–1962.
|-valign=top
|align=right| 123 || 
|
|align=right|  
|align=right|  
|align=right|  
|
Deputy Chief of Naval Operations (Special Weapons), 1945–1946.
Deputy Chief of Naval Operations (Special Weapons)/Commander, Joint Army-Navy Task Force One, 1946.
Commander, Eighth Fleet, 1946–1947.
Commander, Second Task Fleet, 1947.
|(1890–1954) Promoted to admiral, 3 Feb 1947.
|-valign=top
|align=right| 124 || 
|
|align=right|   1 Mar 1949  
|align=right|   1 Jun 1951  
|align=right|  
|
Deputy Chief of Naval Operations (Administration), 1945–1946.
Commander, Tenth Fleet, 1946.
Commander, U.S. Naval Forces Mediterranean, 1946–1948.
U.S. Naval Representative, Military Staff Committee, United Nations/Commandant, Eleventh Naval District, 1949–1951.
|(1889–1971)
|-valign=top
|align=right| 125 || 
|
|align=right|  
|align=right|  
|align=right|  
|
Chief, Bureau of Ordnance, 1944–1947.
|(1894–1983)
|-valign=top
|align=right| 126 || 
|
|align=right|  24 Feb 1948  
|align=right|   1 Jul 1952  
|align=right|  
|
Commander, Service Forces, Pacific Fleet, 1945–1947.
Commander, Naval Forces Western Pacific, 1948–1949.
Commander, Seventh Task Fleet, 1949.
Commander, Eastern Sea Frontier/Atlantic Reserve Fleet, 1950–1951.
Commander, Eastern Sea Frontier/Atlantic Reserve Fleet/U.S. Naval Representative, Military Staff Committee, United Nations, 1951.
Commander, Eastern Sea Frontier/Atlantic Reserve Fleet/U.S. Naval Representative, Military Staff Committee, United Nations/NATO forces, American Defense Area, 1951–1952.
|(1890–1958) Retired as admiral, 1 Jul 1952. Awarded Medal of Honor, 1914. Cousin of U.S. Secretary of the Navy George E. Badger.
|-valign=top
|align=right| 127 || 
|
|align=right|   3 Apr 1950   3 May 1954  
|align=right|  21 Dec 1950  16 Aug 1956  
|align=right|  
|
Deputy Commander in Chief, Pacific Fleet and Pacific Ocean Areas, 1945–1947.
Deputy Commander in Chief, U.S. Pacific Fleet, 1947.
Commander, Battleships-Cruisers, Atlantic Fleet, 1947–1948.
Vice Chief of Naval Operations, 1950–1951.
President, Naval War College, 1954–1956.
|(1895–1956) Promoted to admiral, 22 Dec 1950. Died in office.
|-valign=top
|align=right| 128 || 
|
|align=right|  
|align=right|  
|align=right|  
|
Deputy Chief of Naval Operations (Air), 1946–1947.
Commander, Second Task Fleet, 1947.
Vice Chief of Naval Operations, 1948–1949.
|(1896–1973)Naval aviator. Promoted to admiral, 30 Apr 1949. Married aunt of Army four-star general Michael S. Davison.
|-valign=top
|align=right| 129 || 
|
|align=right|  
|align=right|  
|align=right|  
|
Deputy Chief of Naval Operations (Operations), 1945–1948.
Commander, U.S. Naval Forces Mediterranean, 1948.
Commander, Sixth Task Fleet, 1948–1949.
|(1896–1951)Naval aviator. Promoted to admiral, 2 Nov 1949.
|-valign=top
|align=right| 130 || 
|
|align=right|  
|align=right|  
|align=right|  
|
Commander, Naval Forces Far East, 1946–1948.
|(1889–1976)Naval aviation observer.
|-valign=top
|align=right| 131 || 
|
|align=right|  30 Jun 1952  
|align=right|   1 Feb 1953  
|align=right|  
|
Commander, Battleships-Cruisers, Pacific Fleet, 1946–1948.
Commander, Eastern Sea Frontier/Atlantic Reserve Fleet, 1952–1953.
|(1891–1980)
|-valign=top
|align=right| 132 || 
|
|align=right|  
|align=right|  
|align=right|  
|
Commander, Battleships-Cruisers, Atlantic Fleet, 1946–1947.
Deputy Chief of Naval Operations (Personnel), 1947–1950.
|(1896–1967) Promoted to admiral, 1 Feb 1950.
|-valign=top
|align=right| 133 || 
|
|align=right|  
|align=right|  
|align=right|  
|
Commander, Air Force, Atlantic Fleet, 1946–1948.
Commander, First Task Fleet, 1949–1950.
|(1894–1973)Naval aviator.
|-valign=top
|align=right| 134 || 
|
|align=right|  
|align=right|  
|align=right|  
|
Assistant Chief, Bureau of Ships, 1942–1946.
Chief, Bureau of Ships, 1946–1949.
|(1896–1968) Engineering duty officer.
|-valign=top
|align=right| 135 || 
|
|align=right|  
|align=right|  
|align=right|  
|
Deputy Chief of Naval Operations (Logistics), 1946–1950.
Commander, Second Fleet, 1950.
|(1895–1990) Promoted to admiral, 1 Nov 1950. Aunt married Navy four-star admiral Frank B. Upham.
|-valign=top
|align=right| 136 || 
|
|align=right|  
|align=right|  
|align=right|  
|
Chief of Naval Research, 1946–1947.
|(1883–1965) Engineering duty officer.
|-valign=top
|align=right| 137 || 
|
|align=right|  
|align=right|  
|align=right|  
|
Chief, Bureau of Supplies and Accounts, 1945–1946.
|(1893–1971) Supply Corps.
|-valign=top
|align=right| 138 || 
|
|align=right|  
|align=right|  
|align=right|  
|
Commander, Air Force, Pacific Fleet, 1946–1948.
Deputy Chief of Naval Operations (Air), 1948–1949.
Vice Chief of Naval Operations, 1949–1950.
Chief of Naval Air Training, 1950–1954.
|(1892–1957)Naval aviator. Retired as admiral, 1 Jun 1954.
|-valign=top
|align=right| 139 || 
|
|align=right|  
|align=right|  
|align=right|  
|
Deputy Chief of Naval Operations (Administration), 1946–1947.
Deputy Commander in Chief, U.S. Pacific Fleet, 1948–1949.
Director of Staff, Personnel Policy Board, National Military Establishment, 1949.
Director of Staff, Personnel Policy Board, Department of Defense, 1949–1952.
|(1891–1990)
|-valign=top
|align=right| 140 || 
|
|align=right|  
|align=right|  
|align=right|  
|
Deputy Commander in Chief, Pacific Fleet, 1947.
Deputy Chief of Naval Operations (Air), 1947–1948.
Commander, Second Task Fleet, 1948–1950.
Deputy Chief of Naval Operations (Operations), 1950–1951.
|(1896–1975)Naval aviator. Promoted to admiral, 10 Aug 1951. Governor, U.S. Naval Home, 1957–1962. Brother-in-law of U.S. Secretary of Commerce Harry L. Hopkins.
|-valign=top
|align=right| 141 || 
|
|align=right|  
|align=right|  
|align=right|  
|
Commander, Service Force, Pacific Fleet, 1947–1950.
Deputy Chief of Naval Operations (Logistics), 1950–1953.
Commander, Western Sea Frontier, 1953–1956.
|(1894–1964) Retired as admiral, 1 Jul 1956.
|-valign=top
|align=right| 142 || 
|
|align=right|  
|align=right|  
|align=right|  
|
Deputy Commander in Chief, Pacific Fleet, 1947–1948.
Commander, Air Force, Pacific Fleet, 1948–1949.
|(1895–1977)Naval aviator. Retired as admiral, 1 Oct 1949.
|-valign=top
|align=right| 143 || 
|
|align=right|  
|align=right|  
|align=right|  
|
Chief of Naval Material, 1948–1949.
|(1893–1972) Aeronautical engineering duty officer.
|-valign=top
|align=right| 144 || 
|
|align=right|  
|align=right|  
|align=right|  
|
Deputy Chief of Naval Operations (Operations), 1948–1950.
Commander, Seventh Fleet, 1950–1951.
Commander, First Fleet, 1951–1952.
U.S. Naval Representative, Military Staff Committee, United Nations, 1952–1953.
Chairman, U.S. Military Delegation, Military Staff Committee, United Nations, 1953–1955.
Commander, Eastern Sea Frontier/Atlantic Reserve Fleet, 1955–1956.
|(1894–1983) Retired as admiral, 1 Jul 1956.
|-valign=top
|align=right| 145 || 
|
|align=right|  
|align=right|  
|align=right|  
|
Commander, Naval Forces Far East, 1948–1949.
Commander, Seventh Fleet, 1949–1950.
Chief of Information, 1950.
|(1893–1984) Retired as admiral, 1 Sep 1950.
|-valign=top
|align=right| 146 || 
|
|align=right|  
|align=right|  
|align=right|  
|
President, Naval War College, 1948–1950.
|(1888–1966)
|-valign=top
|align=right| 147 || 
|
|align=right|  
|align=right|  
|align=right|  
|
Commander, Air Force, Atlantic Fleet, 1948–1951.
Commander, Second Fleet, 1951–1953.
|(1894–1972)Naval aviator. Promoted to admiral, 10 Jul 1953.
|-valign=top
|align=right| 148 || 
|
|align=right|  
|align=right|  
|align=right|  
|
Chief of Naval Air Training, 1948–1950.
|(1888–1967)Naval aviator. Retired as admiral, 1 May 1950. General Manager, Los Angeles International Airport, 1950–1952.
|-valign=top
|align=right| 149 || 
|
|align=right|  
|align=right|  
|align=right|  
|
Deputy Chief of Naval Operations (Air), 1949–1950.
Commander, First Fleet, 1950–1951.
|(1893–1965)Naval aviator.
|-valign=top
|align=right| 150 || 
|
|align=right|  
|align=right|  
|align=right|  
|
Commander, Naval Forces Far East, 1949–1952.
Superintendent, U.S. Naval Academy/Commander, Severn River Naval Command, 1952–1954.
|(1895–1956) Retired as admiral, 1 Jul 1954.
|-valign=top
|align=right| 151 || 
|
|align=right|  
|align=right|  
|align=right|  
|
Commander, Air Force, Pacific Fleet/First Task Fleet, 1950.
Commander, Air Force, Pacific Fleet/First Fleet, 1950.
Commander, Air Force, Pacific Fleet, 1950–1952.
|(1894–1972)Naval aviator. Retired as admiral, 1 Apr 1952.
|-valign=top
|align=right| 152 || 
|
|align=right|  
|align=right|  
|align=right|  
|
Chief of Naval Material, 1949–1950.
|(1896–1979) Supply Corps.
|-valign=top
|align=right| 153 || 
|
|align=right|  
|align=right|  
|align=right|  
|
Commander, Sixth Fleet, 1949–1951.
Commander, Air Force, Atlantic Fleet, 1951–1954.
|(1896–1970)Naval aviator. Retired as admiral, 1 May 1954.
|-valign=top
|align=right| 154 || 
|
|align=right|  
|align=right|  
|align=right|  
|
Deputy Chief of Naval Operations (Air), 1950–1952.
Commander, Sixth Fleet, 1952–1954.
|(1896–1969)Naval aviator. Promoted to admiral, 19 Mar 1954.
|-valign=top
|align=right| 155 || 
|
|align=right|  
|align=right|  
|align=right|  
|
Deputy Chief of Naval Operations (Personnel)/Chief of Naval Personnel/Chief, Bureau of Naval Personnel, 1950–1951.
|(1898–1963) Son of U.S. Secretary of Commerce Daniel C. Roper.
|-valign=top
|align=right| 156 || 
|
|align=right|  
|align=right|  
|align=right|  
|
Commander, Second Fleet, 1950–1951.
Commander, Sixth Fleet, 1951–1952.
Deputy Chief of Naval Operations (Air), 1952–1953.
Deputy Chief of Naval Operations (Operations), 1953–1954.
Deputy Chief of Naval Operations (Plans and Policy), 1954–1956.
|(1897–1975)Naval aviator. Retired as admiral, 1 Aug 1956.
|-valign=top
|align=right| 157 || 
|
|align=right|  
|align=right|  
|align=right|  
|
Commander, Amphibious Forces, Atlantic Fleet, 1948–1950.
Deputy U.S. Representative, Standing Group, NATO Military Committee, 1950–1952.
Commander, U.S. Naval Forces, Eastern Atlantic, 1952.
Commander in Chief, U.S. Naval Forces, Eastern Atlantic and Mediterranean, 1952–1954.
|(1898–1995) Promoted to admiral, 12 Apr 1954. U.S. Ambassador to China, 1963–1965.
|-valign=top
|align=right| 158 || 
|
|align=right|  
|align=right|  
|align=right|  
|
Chief of Naval Material, 1950–1951.
|(1885–1980) Retired as admiral, 1 Oct 1951.
|-valign=top
|align=right| 159 || 
|
|align=right|   1 Apr 1955  
|align=right|   1 Oct 1955  
|align=right|  
|
Director, Joint Staff, 1949–1952.
Deputy U.S. Representative, Standing Group, NATO Military Committee, 1952–1953.
Director, Office of Foreign Military Affairs, Department of Defense, 1953–1954.
Deputy Assistant Secretary of Defense (International Security Affairs)/Director, Office of Foreign Military Affairs, Department of Defense, 1954–1955.Deputy Assistant Secretary of Defense (International Security Affairs), 1955.|(1893–1965)Naval aviator. Retired as admiral, 1 Apr 1955.
|-valign=top
|align=right| 160 || 
|
|align=right|  
|align=right|  
|align=right|  
|
Commander, Amphibious Force, U.S. Pacific Fleet, 1950–1952.
Commander, Amphibious Force, U.S. Pacific Fleet/First Fleet, 1952.
Commander, Amphibious Force, U.S. Pacific Fleet, 1952–1953.
|(1895–1992)
|-valign=top
|align=right| 161 || 
|
|align=right|  
|align=right|  
|align=right|  
|
Commander, Amphibious Force, Atlantic Fleet, 1950–1952.
Commander, Naval Forces Far East/Seventh Fleet, 1952.
Commander, Naval Forces Far East, 1952–1954.
Deputy Chief of Naval Operations (Fleet Operations and Readiness), 1954–1956.
|(1897–1968) Promoted to admiral, 2 Jul 1956.
|-valign=top
|align=right| 162 || 
|
|align=right|  
|align=right|  
|align=right|  
|
Commander, First Fleet, 1951.
Commander, Seventh Fleet, 1951–1952.
Commander, Air Force, Pacific Fleet, 1952–1953.
Commander, Air Force, Pacific Fleet/First Fleet, 1953.
Commander, Air Force, Pacific Fleet, 1953–1956.
|(1896–1972)Naval aviator. Retired as admiral, 1 Feb 1956.
|-valign=top
|align=right| 163 || 
|
|align=right|  
|align=right|  
|align=right|  
|
Commander, First Task Fleet, 1948–1949.
Deputy Chief of Naval Operations (Personnel)/Chief of Naval Personnel/Chief, Bureau of Naval Personnel, 1951–1953.
Commander, Eastern Sea Frontier/Atlantic Reserve Fleet, 1953–1955.
|(1893–1967) Retired as admiral, 1 Jun 1955.
|-valign=top
|align=right| 164 || 
|
|align=right|  
|align=right|  
|align=right|  
|
Commander, Military Sea Transportation Service, 1949–1952.
Commander, Amphibious Forces Pacific Fleet, 1953–1954.
Commander, Naval Forces Far East, 1954–1956.
Commander, Western Sea Frontier, 1956–1957.
|(1897–1991)
|-valign=top
|align=right| 165 || 
|
|align=right|  
|align=right|  
|align=right|  
|
Deputy Chief of Naval Operations (Operations), 1951–1953.
Deputy Commander in Chief, Allied Forces Mediterranean, 1953–1955.
|(1897–1975) Retired as admiral, 1 Aug 1955. Director, Mystic Seaport, 1956–1975.
|-valign=top
|align=right| 166 || 
|
|align=right|  
|align=right|  
|align=right|  
|
Chief of Naval Material, 1951–1953.
|(1894–1975) Supply Corps.
|-valign=top
|align=right| 167 || 
|
|align=right|  
|align=right|  
|align=right|  
|
Commander, Amphibious Force, U.S. Atlantic Fleet, 1952–1956.
|(1894–1970) Retired as admiral, 1 May 1956.
|-valign=top
|align=right| 168 || 
|
|align=right|  
|align=right|  
|align=right|  
|
Commander, First Fleet, 1952.
Commander, Seventh Fleet, 1952–1953.
|(1893–1971)Naval aviator. Retired as admiral, Dec 1953.
|-valign=top
|align=right| 169 || 
|
|align=right|  
|align=right|  
|align=right|  
|
Commander, First Fleet, 1952–1953.
Deputy Chief of Naval Operations (Air), 1953–1955.
Commander, Sixth Fleet, 1955–1956.
|(1897–1956)Naval aviator. Died in office.
|-valign=top
|align=right| 170 || 
|
|align=right|  
|align=right|  
|align=right|  
|
Commander, Military Sea Transportation Service, 1952–1956.
|(1896–1987)
|-valign=top
|align=right| 171 || 
|
|align=right|  
|align=right|  
|align=right|  
|
Deputy Chief of Naval Operations (Personnel)/Chief of Naval Personnel/Chief, Bureau of Naval Personnel, 1953–1956.
Deputy Chief of Naval Operations (Personnel and Naval Reserve)/Chief of Naval Personnel/Chief, Bureau of Naval Personnel, 1953–1957.
Commander in Chief, U.S. Naval Forces, Eastern Atlantic and Mediterranean/Commander, Subordinate Command U.S. Atlantic Fleet, 1957–1959.
|(1898–1984) Promoted to admiral, 1 Jan 1958. Superintendent, U.S. Naval Academy, 1947–1950; Governor, U.S. Naval Home, 1962–1966. Father of Navy four-star admiral James L. Holloway III.
|-valign=top
|align=right| 172 || 
|
|align=right|  
|align=right|  
|align=right|  
|
Deputy Chief of Naval Operations (Logistics), 1953–1956.
Commander, Naval Forces Far East, 1956–1958.
|(1897–1974) Retired as admiral, 1 Mar 1958.
|-valign=top
|align=right| 173 || 
|
|align=right|  
|align=right|  
|align=right|  
|
Commander, Second Fleet, 1953–1954.
Commander, Sixth Fleet, 1954–1955.
Deputy Chief of Naval Operations (Air), 1955–1956.
Deputy Chief of Naval Operations (Fleet Operations and Readiness), 1956–1957.
Deputy Chief of Naval Operations (Fleet Operations, Readiness, Research and Development), 1957–1958.
Deputy Chief of Naval Operations (Fleet Operations and Readiness), 1958.
Commander, Eastern Sea Frontier/Atlantic Reserve Fleet/U.S. Naval Representative, Military Staff Committee, United Nations/Commandant, Third Naval District/Commander, Naval Base, New York, 1958–1960.
|(1898–1964)Naval aviator.
|-valign=top
|align=right| 174 || 
|
|align=right|  
|align=right|  
|align=right|  
|
Deputy Chief of Naval Operations (Administration), 1953.
Chief of Naval Material, 1953–1954.
|(1897–1960) Retired as admiral, 1 Oct 1954.
|-valign=top
|align=right| 175 || 
|
|align=right|  
|align=right|  
|align=right|  
|
Commander, First Fleet, 1953–1955.
|(1894–1986) Retired as admiral, 1 Aug 1955.
|-valign=top
|align=right| 176 || 
|
|align=right|  
|align=right|  
|align=right|  
|
Commander, Seventh Fleet, 1953–1955.
Commander, Seventh Fleet/Formosa Defense Command, 1955.
Commander, Seventh Fleet/U.S. Taiwan Defense Command, 1955.
Commander, Air Force, Pacific Fleet, 1956–1957.
Commander, Naval Air Force, Pacific Fleet, 1957–1959.
|(1897–1988)Naval aviator. Retired as admiral, 1 Oct 1959.
|-valign=top
|align=right| 177 || 
|
|align=right|  12 Feb 1962  26 Aug 1963  
|align=right|   1 Jul 1963  10 Oct 1963  
|align=right|  
|
Commander, Amphibious Force, U.S. Pacific Fleet, 1954–1956.Member, Gorham Military Pay Study Group, 1962–1963.|(1895–1980)
|-valign=top
|align=right| 178 || 
|
|align=right|  
|align=right|  
|align=right|  
|
Commander, Second Fleet, 1954–1955.
Commandant, National War College, 1955.
Commandant, National War College/Chairman, Inter-American Defense Board, 1955–1956.
Commandant, National War College, 1956–1958.
|(1897–1968) Retired as admiral, 1 Aug 1958.
|-valign=top
|align=right| 179 || 
|
|align=right|  
|align=right|  
|align=right|  
|
Commander, Air Force, Atlantic Fleet, 1954–1956.
Commander, Eastern Sea Frontier/Atlantic Reserve Fleet/U.S. Naval Representative, Military Staff Committee, United Nations, 1956–1958.
|(1898–1986)Naval aviator.
|-valign=top
|align=right| 180 || 
|
|align=right|  
|align=right|  
|align=right|  
|
Chief of Naval Air Training, 1954–1957.
Commander, U.S. Taiwan Defense Command/Chief, Military Assistance Advisory Group, Taiwan, 1957–1958.
|(1898–1970)Naval aviator. Retired as admiral, 1 Aug 1958.
|-valign=top
|align=right| 181 || 
|
|align=right|  
|align=right|  
|align=right|  
|
Chief of Naval Material, 1954–1956.
|(1894–1985) Supply Corps.
|-valign=top
|align=right| 182 || 
|
|align=right|  
|align=right|  
|align=right|  
|
Commander, Second Fleet/Striking Fleet Atlantic, 1955–1957.
Commandant, Armed Forces Staff College, 1957–1960.
Commander, Eastern Sea Frontier/Atlantic Reserve Fleet/U.S. Naval Representative, Military Staff Committee, United Nations/Commandant, Third Naval District/Commander, Naval Base, New York, 1960–1961.
Commander, Eastern Sea Frontier/Atlantic Reserve Fleet/Chairman, U.S. Delegation, Military Staff Committee, United Nations, 1961–1963.
|(1901–1988)
|-valign=top
|align=right| 183 || 
|
|align=right|   1 Feb 1958  
|align=right|   1 Apr 1960  
|align=right|  
|
Deputy Commander in Chief/Chief of Staff, Pacific Fleet, 1955–1958.
Commander, Western Sea Frontier/Naval Defense Force, Eastern Pacific, 1958–1960.
|(1898–1976) Promoted to admiral, 29 Apr 1957.
|-valign=top
|align=right| 184 || 
|
|align=right|  
|align=right|  
|align=right|  
|
Commander, First Fleet, 1955–1956.
Deputy Chief of Naval Operations (Logistics), 1956–1958.
|(1898–1966) Promoted to admiral, 1 Feb 1958.
|-valign=top
|align=right| 185 || 
|
|align=right|  
|align=right|  
|align=right|  
|
Deputy Chief of Naval Operations (Administration), 1955–1957.
|(1900–1978)
|-valign=top
|align=right| 186 || 
|
|align=right|  25 Jul 1960  
|align=right|   1 May 1961  
|align=right|  
|
Commander, Seventh Fleet/U.S. Taiwan Defense Command, 1955–1957.
Commander, U.S. Taiwan Defense Command, 1957.
President, Naval War College, 1957–1960.Member, Ad Hoc Committee to Study and Revise the Officer Personnel Act of 1947, 1960–1961.|(1898–1983)Naval aviator.
|-valign=top
|align=right| 187 || 
|
|align=right|  
|align=right|  
|align=right|  
|
Naval Inspector General, 1954–1956.
|(1898–1980) Retired as admiral, 1 Aug 1956. Nephew of Oklahoma Governor William H. Murray.
|-valign=top
|align=right| 189 || 
|
|align=right|  
|align=right|  
|align=right|  
|
Deputy Commander in Chief, Allied Forces Mediterranean, 1956–1957.
|(1897–1988)Naval aviator. Retired as admiral, 1 Sep 1957.
|-valign=top
|align=right| 190 || 
|
|align=right|  
|align=right|  
|align=right|  
|
Deputy Commander in Chief, U.S. Atlantic Fleet/Chief of Staff and Aide to the Commander in Chief, Atlantic/U.S. Atlantic Fleet/Western Atlantic, 1956.
Commander, Sixth Fleet, 1956–1959.
|(1899–1983)Naval aviator. Promoted to admiral, 1 Jan 1959.
|-valign=top
|align=right| 191 || 
|
|align=right|  
|align=right|  
|align=right|  
|
Chief of Naval Material, 1956–1960.
|(1900–1966) Aeronautical engineering duty officer.
|-valign=top
|align=right| 192 || 
|
|align=right|  
|align=right|  
|align=right|  
|
Chief of Staff and Aide to the Supreme Allied Commander Atlantic, 1955–1956.
|(1900–1962)
|-valign=top
|align=right| 193 || 
|
|align=right|   1 Aug 1964  
|align=right|  17 Oct 1967  
|align=right|  
|
Director, Joint Staff, 1956–1958.
Commander, Second Fleet, 1958–1959.
Deputy Chief of Naval Operations (Plans and Policy), 1959–1960.
President, Naval War College, 1960–1964.Chairman, Inter-American Defense Board, 1964–1967.|(1902–1979)
|-valign=top
|align=right| 194 || 
|
|align=right|  
|align=right|  
|align=right|  
|
Commander, Sixth Fleet, 1956.
|(1902–1992)Naval aviator. Promoted to admiral, 1 Sep 1956.
|-valign=top
|align=right| 195 || 
|
|align=right|  
|align=right|  
|align=right|  
|
Deputy Chief of Naval Operations (Fleet Operations and Readiness), 1956.
Deputy Chief of Naval Operations (Plans and Policy), 1956–1958.
Commander, First Fleet, 1958–1960.
|(1900–1986)
|-valign=top
|align=right| 196 || 
|
|align=right|  
|align=right|  
|align=right|  
|
Commander, Amphibious Force, U.S. Atlantic Fleet, 1956–1957.
Chief of Staff and Aide to the Supreme Allied Commander Atlantic, 1957–1961.
|(1899–1988)
|-valign=top
|align=right| 197 || 
|
|align=right|  
|align=right|  
|align=right|  
|
Commander, Air Force, Atlantic Fleet, 1956–1960.
|(1900–1989)Naval aviator.
|-valign=top
|align=right| 198 || 
|
|align=right|  
|align=right|  
|align=right|  
|
Commander, First Fleet, 1956–1958.
Deputy Chief of Naval Operations (Plans and Policy), 1958–1959.
|(1901–1980)Naval aviator. Promoted to admiral, 31 Mar 1959.
|-valign=top
|align=right| 199 || 
|
|align=right|  
|align=right|  
|align=right|  
|
Commander, Military Sea Transportation Service, 1956–1959.
|(1899–1981) Retired as admiral, 1 Jul 1959.
|-valign=top
|align=right| 200 || 
|
|align=right|  
|align=right|  
|align=right|  
|
Commander, Amphibious Force, U.S. Pacific Fleet, 1956–1958.
|(1900–1988)
|-valign=top
|align=right| 201 || 
|
|align=right|  
|align=right|  
|align=right|  
|
Naval Inspector General, 1956–1957.
|(1897–1982) Director of Central Intelligence, 1947–1950.
|-valign=top
|align=right| 202 || 
|
|align=right|  
|align=right|  
|align=right|  
|
Deputy Chief of Naval Operations (Air), 1956–1958.
Deputy Commander in Chief, U.S. Atlantic Fleet/Chief of Staff and Aide to the Commander in Chief, Atlantic/U.S. Atlantic Fleet/Western Atlantic, 1958–1960.
|(1902–1981)Naval aviator.
|-valign=top
|align=right| 203 || 
|
|align=right|  
|align=right|  
|align=right|  
|
Deputy Commander in Chief/Chief of Staff, U.S. Atlantic Fleet, 1956–1957.
Chief of Naval Air Training, 1957–1961.
Commander, Western Sea Frontier, 1961–1963.
|(1903–1979)Naval aviator.
|-valign=top
|align=right| 204 || 
|
|align=right|  
|align=right|  
|align=right|  
|
Chief of Staff and Aide to the Supreme Allied Commander Atlantic, 1956–1957.
Deputy Chief of Naval Operations (Personnel and Naval Reserve)/Chief of Naval Personnel/Chief, Bureau of Naval Personnel, 1958–1960.
|(1904–1993) Promoted to admiral, 18 Feb 1960. Uncle of Navy four-star admiral Leighton W. Smith Jr.
|-valign=top
|align=right| 205 || 
|
|align=right|  
|align=right|  
|align=right|  
|
Commander, Seventh Fleet, 1957–1958.
Deputy Chief of Naval Operations (Plans and Readiness), 1958.
Deputy Chief of Naval Operations (Fleet Operations and Readiness), 1958–1961.
Deputy Commander in Chief, U.S. Atlantic Fleet/Chief of Staff and Aide to the Commander in Chief, Atlantic/U.S. Atlantic Fleet/Western Atlantic, 1961–1963.
|(1903–1975)Naval aviator.
|-valign=top
|align=right| 206 || 
|
|align=right|  14 Sep 1959  
|align=right|  31 Jul 1961  
|align=right|  
|
Chief of Staff/Aide to the Commander in Chief, Pacific Command, 1957–1958.
Commander, Sixth Fleet/Naval Striking and Support Forces, Southern Europe, 1959–1961.
|(1906–1992)Naval aviator. Promoted to admiral, 1 Aug 1961. U.S. Ambassador to Portugal, 1963–1966.
|-valign=top
|align=right| 207 || 
|
|align=right|  
|align=right|  
|align=right|  
|
Commander, Second Fleet, 1957–1958.
Deputy Chief of Naval Operations (Air), 1958–1962.
|(1905–1990)Naval aviator.
|-valign=top
|align=right| 208 || 
|
|align=right|  
|align=right|  
|align=right|  
|
Commander, Anti-Submarine Defense Force, U.S. Atlantic Fleet, 1957–1958.
|(1898–1980)
|-valign=top
|align=right| 209 || 
|
|align=right|  
|align=right|  
|align=right|  
|
Director, Weapons Systems Evaluation Group, 1957–1960.
|(1904–1978) Promoted to admiral, 31 Aug 1960.
|-valign=top
|align=right| 210 || 
|
|align=right|  
|align=right|  
|align=right|  
|
Deputy Commander in Chief, U.S. Atlantic Fleet/Chief of Staff and Aide to the Commander in Chief, Atlantic/U.S. Atlantic Fleet/Western Atlantic, 1957–1958.
|(1903–1996)Naval aviator. Promoted to admiral, 21 Jul 1958.
|-valign=top
|align=right| 211 || 
|
|align=right|  
|align=right|  
|align=right|  
|
Commander, Amphibious Force, U.S. Atlantic Fleet, 1957–1958.
|(1899–1977) Retired as admiral, 1 Oct 1958.
|-valign=top
|align=right| 212 || 
|
|align=right|  
|align=right|  
|align=right|  
|
Deputy Chief of Naval Operations (Logistics), 1957–1960.
|(1902–1990)
|-valign=top
|align=right| 213 || 
|
|align=right|  
|align=right|  
|align=right|  
|
Chief of Staff, Pacific Command, 1958–1961.
Deputy Chief of Naval Operations (Fleet Operations and Readiness), 1961–1962.
Director, Joint Staff, 1962–1964.
|(1904–1973)Naval aviator.
|-valign=top
|align=right| 214 || 
|
|align=right|  
|align=right|  
|align=right|  
|
Commander, Amphibious Force, U.S. Pacific Fleet, 1958–1960.
Deputy Chief of Naval Operations (Logistics), 1960–1964.
|(1904–1990)
|-valign=top
|align=right| 215 || 
|
|align=right|  
|align=right|  
|align=right|  
|
Commander, U.S. Taiwan Defense Command/Chief, Military Assistance Advisory Group, Taiwan, 1958–1962.
|(1901–1984)
|-valign=top
|align=right| 216 || 
|
|align=right|  
|align=right|  
|align=right|  
|
Commander, Anti-Submarine Defense Force, U.S. Atlantic Fleet, 1958–1960.
|(1903–1971)
|-valign=top
|align=right| 217 || 
|
|align=right|  
|align=right|  
|align=right|  
|
Commander, Sixth Fleet, 1958–1959.
Commander, Naval Air Force, U.S. Pacific Fleet, 1959–1962.
|(1902–1986)Naval aviator.
|-valign=top
|align=right| 218 || 
|
|align=right|  
|align=right|  
|align=right|  
|
Commander, Seventh Fleet, 1958–1960.
Commander, Western Sea Frontier, 1960–1961.
|(1902–1975)Naval aviator.
|-valign=top
|align=right| 219 || 
|
|align=right|  
|align=right|  
|align=right|  
|
Commander, Amphibious Force, U.S. Atlantic Fleet, 1958–1960.
|(1901–1999)
|-valign=top
|align=right| 220 || 
|
|align=right|   1 Feb 1964  
|align=right|  15 Nov 1973  
|align=right|  
|
Director, Naval Reactors Division, Atomic Energy Commission/Deputy Commander for Nuclear Propulsion, Naval Sea Systems Command, 1948–1964.Director, Naval Reactors Division, Atomic Energy Commission/Deputy Commander for Nuclear Propulsion, Naval Sea Systems Command, 1964–1982.|(1900–1986) Engineering duty officer. Promoted to admiral, 16 Nov 1973. Awarded Presidential Medal of Freedom, 1980; Congressional Gold Medal, 1958 and 1982.
|-valign=top
|align=right| 221 || 
|
|align=right|  
|align=right|  
|align=right|  
|
Commander, Second Fleet, 1959–1960.
Deputy Chief of Naval Operations (Personnel and Naval Reserve)/Chief of Naval Personnel/Chief, Bureau of Naval Personnel, 1960–1964.
|(1902–1994)
|-valign=top
|align=right| 222 || 
|
|align=right|  13 Jun 1963  
|align=right|   1 Sep 1968  
|align=right|  
|
Deputy Chief of Naval Operations (Development), 1959–1962.
Commander, Anti-Submarine Warfare Force, U.S. Pacific Fleet, 1963–1966.
President, Naval War College, 1966–1968.
|(1908–1999)Naval aviator.
|-valign=top
|align=right| 223 || 
| 
|align=right|  
|align=right|  
|align=right|  
|
Commander, Military Sea Transportation Service, 1959–1964.
|(1902–1971)
|-valign=top
|align=center| * || 
|
|align=right|  11 Aug 1963  
|align=right|   1 Jan 1964  
|align=right|  
|Director, Petroleum Logistics Policy, Office of the Assistant Secretary of Defense (Installations and Logistics), 1959–1963.Special Assistant to Assistant Secretary of Defense (Installations and Logistics), 1963–1964.|(1898–1967)
|-
|}

Timeline

An officer held the active-duty grade of vice admiral (Vice Adm.) in the U.S. Navy until his death; retirement; resignation; reversion to lower permanent grade upon vacating a position carrying the ex officio rank; or promotion to a higher grade such as admiral (Adm.) or fleet admiral (Fleet Adm.). An officer on the retired list could also be recalled to active duty in the grade of vice admiral (Vice Adm. (ret.)) or admiral (Adm. (ret.)).

Between World War I and World War II, there were three ex officio vice admiral positions. One commanded the battleships of the United States Fleet (BATSHIPS), and a second commanded the Scouting Force (SCOFOR). The third position was successively allocated to command the naval forces in Europe (NAVEUR), the cruisers of the Scouting Force (CRUSCOFOR), and the aircraft carriers of the Battle Force (AIRBATFOR).

History

Civil War

The grade of vice admiral in the United States Navy was created by Congress in December 1864 to honor David G. Farragut for his victory at the Battle of Mobile Bay during the American Civil War. The promotion made Farragut the senior officer in the Navy but did not give him command of all naval forces, unlike the corresponding grade of lieutenant general that had been revived for Ulysses S. Grant earlier that year. After the war, Farragut was promoted to admiral and his vacated vice admiralcy was filled by David D. Porter. When Farragut died in 1870, Porter succeeded him as admiral and Stephen C. Rowan became vice admiral. Three years later, Congress stopped further promotions to admiral or vice admiral, and the vice admiral grade expired with Rowan in 1890.

After the Spanish-American War, Congress tried to revive the grade to reward William T. Sampson and Winfield S. Schley for winning the Battle of Santiago de Cuba, but the officers feuded bitterly over credit for the victory and their partisans in the Senate could not agree on who would be the senior vice admiral, so neither was promoted. Even after Sampson died in 1902, his admirers continued to prevent Schley from being promoted, while Schley's friends blocked all moves to elevate any other officer over him during his lifetime, such as an attempt to promote Robley D. Evans to vice admiral on the retired list in 1909. No new vice admirals were created until after Schley's death in 1911.

World War I

In 1915, Congress authorized the President to designate the commanders in chief of the Pacific, Atlantic, and Asiatic Fleets to hold the rank of admiral, and their seconds in command the rank of vice admiral. The chief of naval operations (CNO) received the rank of admiral the following year. Because Porter and Rowan had been promoted permanently to vice admiral and then never gone to sea again, Congress made these new ranks strictly ex officio. Upon relinquishing command, an officer lost his designation as admiral or vice admiral and reverted to his permanent grade of rear admiral. The three fleet commanders were immediately made admirals to match the rank of their foreign counterparts, but only the second in command of the Atlantic Fleet, Henry T. Mayo, was designated a vice admiral, since the Pacific and Asiatic Fleets were too small to employ their vice admirals.

When the United States entered World War I, Congress generalized the law to let the President designate up to six commanders of any fleet or subdivision of a fleet to hold ranks higher than rear admiral, of which up to three could be admirals and the rest vice admirals. This allowed William S. Sims to be designated vice admiral as commander of U.S. Naval Forces in European Waters. The other two vice admiral designations went to the Atlantic Fleet's two battleship force commanders. When the Asiatic Fleet's commander in chief retired in December 1918, his four-star designation was transferred to Sims, whose vacated vice admiralcy went to Albert Gleaves, commander of the Atlantic Fleet's cruiser and transport force. By the end of 1918, all three seagoing admirals and all three vice admirals were assigned to the Atlantic and European theaters, including the four-star commander in chief of the Pacific Fleet, who had taken a force to patrol the South Atlantic Ocean.

With the end of hostilities in Europe, the six designations for admirals and vice admirals were redistributed in 1919. The commanders in chief of the Atlantic and Pacific Fleets remained admirals. About half of the major ships in the Atlantic Fleet transferred to the Pacific Fleet, which was now large enough to employ a vice admiral to command its battleship force. A second vice admiral commanded the battleship force of the Atlantic Fleet, and a third vice admiral, Gleaves, commanded its cruiser and transport force. The sixth designation returned to the Asiatic Fleet when Sims left his European command, but its commander in chief, William L. Rodgers, was promoted only to vice admiral since Gleaves was already slated to be its admiral, so for a few months there were four vice admirals and only three admirals, including the CNO.

In September 1919, Gleaves was appointed commander in chief of the Asiatic Fleet with the rank of admiral. Rodgers remained vice admiral in command of Division 1 of the Asiatic Fleet until January 1920, so for the first and only time, the Pacific, Atlantic, and Asiatic Fleets each had an admiral and vice admiral, as originally envisioned in 1915.

Interwar

In 1922 the three fleets were combined into a single United States Fleet with three admirals and three vice admirals. One admiral served as commander in chief of the United States Fleet (CINCUS), a second admiral as commander in chief of the Asiatic Fleet, and the third admiral as commander in chief of the former Pacific Fleet, now the Battle Fleet. A vice admiral commanded the former Atlantic Fleet, now the Scouting Fleet, and a second vice admiral commanded the battleship divisions of the Battle Fleet. The Battle Fleet and Scouting Fleet became the Battle Force and Scouting Force, respectively, when the United States Fleet was reorganized into type commands in 1931. When the Pacific and Atlantic Fleets were reconstituted in February 1941, CINCUS was dual-hatted as commander in chief of the Pacific Fleet (CINCPAC), and the commander in chief of the Atlantic Fleet was made an admiral by downgrading the Battle Force's commander to vice admiral and its battleship commander to rear admiral.

The third vice admiral designation moved from the Asiatic Fleet to the commander of U.S. Naval Forces in European Waters in 1920 and lapsed when the European force was disbanded in 1929. It was revived the next year for the commander of the Scouting Fleet's light cruiser divisions and subsequently the Scouting Force's cruisers, before migrating in 1935 to the commander of the Battle Force's aircraft.

A flag officer in the United States Fleet climbed a cursus honorum that nominally began with command of a battleship division as a rear admiral, followed by command of all battleship divisions in the Battle Force as a vice admiral, then command of the entire Battle Force as an admiral, and finally either CINCUS, the highest office afloat, or CNO, the highest office ashore—or both, in the case of William V. Pratt. Upon leaving the fleet, it was normal for a former three- or four-star commander to revert to his permanent grade of rear admiral and remain on active duty until statutory retirement as president of the Naval War College, commandant of a naval district, or member of the General Board.

Since there were four admirals and only three vice admirals, it was not uncommon to skip the rank of vice admiral entirely, especially for commanders in chief of the Asiatic Fleet, which was seen as a four-star consolation prize for flag officers who were out of the running for CINCUS or CNO. By the early 1940s, neither the CNO (Harold R. Stark), CINCUS (Claude C. Bloch, James O. Richardson), nor CINCPAC (Husband E. Kimmel, Chester W. Nimitz) had ever been a vice admiral.

World War II

In July 1941, Congress authorized the President to designate, at his own discretion, up to nine additional officers to carry the ex officio'' rank of vice admiral while performing special or unusual duty, for a total of 12 vice admirals in the permanent establishment. The first of the nine new vice admiral designations was assigned to Robert L. Ghormley, then serving as special observer in the U.S. Embassy in London. After the United States entry into World War II in December 1941, the new commander in chief of the Atlantic Fleet, Royal E. Ingersoll, was designated a vice admiral after his predecessor, Ernest J. King, was appointed commander in chief of the United States Fleet (COMINCH, formerly CINCUS) and took the Atlantic Fleet's four-star designation with him. The remaining seven vice admiral slots were quickly filled by the director of the Office of Procurement and Material and the commanders of U.S. Naval Forces, Southwest Pacific; ANZAC Force; the service forces in the Atlantic and Pacific Fleets; and two anti-submarine task forces in the Atlantic Fleet.

All 12 vice admiral designations were in use by March 1942, when a headquarters reorganization called for two more vice admirals to be vice chief of naval operations and chief of staff to COMINCH. Frederick J. Horne and Russell Willson were nominated to be temporary vice admirals, under a 1941 statute that authorized an unlimited number of appointments in all grades for temporary service during a national emergency, with temporary flag officers needing confirmation by the Senate. The statute technically created temporary grades only up to rear admiral, but the Senate confirmed Horne and Willson as vice admirals anyway, and continued to confirm temporary admirals and vice admirals when nominated. Dozens of temporary vice admirals were appointed during World War II, either to serve in a specified job or simply for the duration of the national emergency.

Postwar

The Officer Personnel Act of 1947 consolidated the various laws governing vice admiral appointments. Previously, the President had controlled a pool of 12 vice admiral designations that he could assign at his own discretion. In addition, the Senate could confirm an unlimited number of officers nominated by the President to hold the temporary personal grade of vice admiral, either while serving in a particular job or for the duration of a national emergency. Under the new law, all vice admirals had to be confirmed by the Senate, and held that temporary grade only while serving in a particular job. The maximum number of vice admirals was proportional to the total number of flag officers.

The new law also made any former admiral or vice admiral eligible to retire with that rank, simplifying the hodgepodge of rules that had promoted various classes of retirees piecemeal. Originally every designated admiral and vice admiral retired in his permanent grade of rear admiral. In 1930 Congress promoted officers on the retired list to their highest rank held during World War I, which was defined as having ended on July 2, 1921, so John D. McDonald, who became vice admiral on July 1, 1921, was promoted, but William R. Shoemaker, who became vice admiral only a week later, was not. In 1942 former fleet commanders were allowed to retire as admiral or vice admiral if they had served in that grade for at least a year, a cutoff that John H. Dayton and Walton R. Sexton both missed by about two weeks. Dayton lived long enough to be advanced back to vice admiral by the Officer Personnel Act of 1947, but Sexton did not.

Postwar vice admirals typically headed directorates in the Office of the Chief of Naval Operations, numbered fleets, type commands, sea frontiers, senior educational institutions like the National War College and the Naval War College, or other interservice or international positions. Upon completing their capstone assignments, many senior flag officers resumed the prewar pattern of remaining on active duty in a lower grade until statutory retirement, in contrast to Army and Air Force general officers who usually preferred to retire immediately to avoid demotion. For example, Lynde D. McCormick reverted from vice admiral to rear admiral but rose again to vice admiral and admiral before dropping to vice admiral for his final assignment.

Tombstone promotions

In 1925 Congress authorized Navy and Marine Corps officers who had been specially commended for performance of duty in actual combat during World War I to retire with the rank of the next higher grade but not its pay. Such honorary increases in rank at retirement were dubbed tombstone promotions, since their only tangible benefit was the right to carve the higher rank on the officer's tombstone. Later laws expanded eligibility beyond World War I and to officers already on the retired list. Tombstone promotions were limited in 1947 to duty performed before the end of World War II, meaning before January 1, 1947, and halted entirely in 1959. By May 29, 1959, there were 154 vice admirals on the retired list who had never served on active duty in that rank, not counting those already deceased.

Dozens of vice admirals received tombstone promotions to admiral. Even if a vice admiral reverted to rear admiral, he could still retire as a vice admiral and then claim a tombstone promotion to admiral, but only if he had satisfactory service in the temporary grade of vice admiral during World War II. For example, Gerald F. Bogan, David W. Bagley, Robert C. Giffen, and Alexander Sharp Jr. all reverted to rear admiral after serving as a vice admiral, and all qualified for a tombstone promotion, but only Bagley was advanced to admiral when he retired.

 Bogan was confirmed by the Senate to be a temporary vice admiral while commanding the First Task Fleet after World War II, but offended the secretary of the Navy during the so-called Revolt of the Admirals and was relieved of his three-star command only three weeks before he was scheduled to retire with a tombstone promotion to admiral. Instead, he reverted to rear admiral and received a tombstone promotion back to vice admiral.

 Bagley was confirmed by the Senate to be a temporary vice admiral while serving in a succession of jobs during World War II, before reverting to rear admiral. He retired in his highest wartime grade of vice admiral and received a tombstone promotion to admiral.
 Giffen was confirmed by the Senate to be a temporary vice admiral while commanding the Caribbean Sea Frontier during World War II, but was reprimanded for misconduct in that role. Having unsatisfactory service as a vice admiral, he retired as a rear admiral and received a tombstone promotion back to vice admiral.

 Sharp was designated by the President to hold the rank of vice admiral while commanding the Service Force, Atlantic Fleet during World War II, but was never confirmed by the Senate to hold the temporary personal grade of vice admiral, unlike Bagley and Giffen. Sharp retired with his highest active-duty rank of vice admiral but was not advanced to admiral because tombstone promotions were based on personal grades, not designated ranks.

Legislative history
The following list of Congressional legislation includes all acts of Congress pertaining to appointments to the grade of vice admiral in the United States Navy before 1960.

Each entry lists an act of Congress, its citation in the United States Statutes at Large, and a summary of the act's relevance.

See also
Vice admiral (United States)
List of lieutenant generals in the United States Army before 1960
List of lieutenant generals in the United States Air Force before 1960
List of United States Marine Corps lieutenant generals on active duty before 1960
List of United States Navy tombstone vice admirals
List of United States Navy vice admirals from 2010 to 2019
List of United States Navy vice admirals since 2020
List of United States Navy four-star admirals

Notes

References

Navy Department

Other registers

Other resources

 
United States Navy
United States Navy admirals
United States Navy admirals
Admirals